The Congo national rugby union team represents the Republic of the Congo at rugby union.

They have not qualified for the rugby world cup.

They competed in the 2008 Castel Beer Trophy (played from 4 May to 8 May), which was hosted in Burundi, and they made their test debut in this tournament.. In 2010, the team debuted in the CAR Trophy, losing to Niger, at Niamey, by 23-6.

See also
 Rugby union in the Republic of the Congo

African national rugby union teams
National sports teams of the Republic of the Congo